Year 1194 (MCXCIV) was a common year starting on Saturday (link will display the full calendar) of the Julian calendar.

Events 
 By place 

 England 
 February 4 – King Richard I (the Lionheart) is ransomed for an amount of 150,000 marks (demanded by Emperor Henry VI), raised by his mother Eleanor of Aquitaine – who travels to Austria to gain his release. Henry will never receive the full amount he demanded. In March, Richard returns to England, and remains for only a few weeks before returning to the Continent. He leaves the administration of England in the hands of Hubert Walter, archbishop of Canterbury, who accompanied Richard on the Third Crusade and led his army back to England. He levied the taxes to pay the king's ransom and put down a plot against Richard by his younger brother John.
 March 12–28 – Richard I besieges Nottingham Castle (occupied by supporters of John) – which falls after a siege of several days. Richard is aided by English troops under Ranulf de Blondeville and David of Scotland.
 April 17 – Richard I is crowned for the second time, at Winchester, to underline his rightful position as monarch. During the coronation, he wears a golden crown and is followed by notables from the Church and State.
 May – Richard I calls for a council in Nottingham to raise funds for an expedition to France. On May 12, he leaves for Normandy with a large fleet (some 300 ships), to reclaim lands lost to King Philip II (Augustus).
 Ordinance of the Jewry: Beginning of strict records of financial transactions by Jews liable to taxation. The Exchequer of the Jews at Westminster regulates the taxes and the law-cases (also in Wales).

 Europe 
 Spring – Casimir II (the Just), High Duke of Poland, organizes an expedition against the Baltic Yotvingians. The expedition ends with full success, and Casimir has a triumphant return in Kraków. On May 5, after a banquet, which is held to celebrate his return, Casimir dies unexpectedly (possibly poisoned). He is succeeded by his eldest surviving son Leszek I (the White), who has to face strong opposition from his uncle Mieszko III (the Old). 
 July 3 – Battle of Fréteval: English forces under Richard I defeat Philip II, and capture the French baggage train. It contains the royal archives – including a list of the treasure of the French kingdom (transported in a wagon behind the army). Philip withdraws across the River Epte, where the bridge collapses under the weight of the retreating army. Meanwhile, Richard sacks the town of Évreux, which is a possession of Philip's ally, John.
 November 20 – Emperor Henry VI enforces the inheritance claims by his wife, Constance I, against her illegitimate nephew, King Tancred of Lecce (who died on February 20). He takes Palermo (supported by the navy of Pisa and Genoa) and gains control of all of Sicily – ending Norman rule in Italy after 90 years.
 December 25 – Henry VI deposes the 8-year-old William III (son of Tancred de Lecce) and is crowned king of Sicily. The next day, Constance I, who stays in the town of Iesi, gives birth to Frederick II, the future emperor of the Holy Roman Empire.

 Levant 
 October – Leo I (Lord of the Mountains), ruler of  Armenian Cilicia, invites Bohemond III of Antioch to Bagras, ostensibly to resolve their differences. Upon Bohemond's arrival, Leon captures him and his family, and takes them to the capital of Sis.

 Seljuk Empire 
 March 10 – Sultan Toghrul III is defeated and killed in battle with Ala ad-Din Tekish, near Rey in Persia – ending the Seljuk Dynasty of Hamedan. The Seljuk Empire passes to the Khwarazmian Dynasty.

 China 
 July 24 – Emperor Guang Zong (or Zhao Dun) is forced to abdicate the throne to his 25-year-old son Ning Zong, who succeeds him as ruler of the Song Dynasty. During his reign, he will be dominated by his prime-minister Han Tuozhou (or Han T'o-Chou).
 The Yellow River experiences a major course change, taking over the Huai River drainage system for the next 700 years.

 Mesoamerica 
 Hunac Ceel drives the Itza people out of Chichen Itza, forcing them to start the Itza Kingdom on Lake Petén Itzá (modern Guatemala).

 By topic  

 Commerce 
 May 2 – Richard I grants Portsmouth market-town status with a royal charter. He orders the construction of docks on The Solent – having seen that the harbour is a perfect base for trade and the English fleet.

 Economy and Society 
 Hubert Walter, vice-regent in the absence of Richard I, institutes the office of coroner to keep records of crown pleas. He also presides over the feudal judgment of John and makes an inquiry into land tenure.

 Religion 
 July 10 – A fire devastates Chartres Cathedral. Only the crypt, the towers, and the new facade survives. Funds are collected from nobles, as well as small donations from ordinary people, to start the rebuilding.

Births 
 April 25 – Ezzelino III, Italian nobleman and knight (d. 1259)
 July 16 – Clare of Assisi, Italian nun and saint (d. 1253)
 November 30 – Andrea Caccioli, Italian priest (d. 1254) 
 December 26 – Frederick II, Holy Roman Emperor (d. 1250)
 Jacob Anatoli, French Jewish translator and writer (d. 1256)
 Jacopo Contarini, doge of Venice (House of Contarini) (d. 1280)
 Lý Huệ Tông, Vietnamese emperor (Lý Dynasty) (d. 1226)
 Majd al-Din Taymiyyah, Seljuk judge and theologian (d. 1255)
 Margaret, marchioness of Namur (House of Vianden) (d. 1270)
 Maurice FitzGerald, Norman nobleman and justiciar (d. 1257)
 Moses ben Nahman, Spanish rabbi and philosopher (d. 1270)
 Otto I, Dutch nobleman and bishop (House of Gelre) (d. 1215)
 Richard Mór de Burgh, Norman nobleman (approximate date)
 Rusudan, queen of Georgia (House of Bagrationi) (d. 1245)
 Saionji Saneuji, Japanese nobleman and waka poet (d. 1269)

Deaths 
 February 20 – Tancred of Lecce, king of Sicily (b. 1138)
 March 19 – Toghrul III, sultan of the Seljuk Empire
 April 3 
 Bård Guttormsson, Norwegian nobleman 
Sigurd Magnusson, Norwegian nobleman
 April 20 – Odon of Poznań, duke of Greater Poland
 May 5 – Casimir II (the Just), duke of Lesser Poland
 June 27 – Sancho VI (the Wise), king of Navarre (b. 1132)
 June 28 – Xiao Zong, Chinese emperor (Song Dynasty) (b. 1127)
 July 18 – Guy of Lusignan, king of Jerusalem (b. 1150)
 July 27 – Sviatoslav III, Kievan Grand Prince (b. 1126)
 November 15 – Margaret I, countess of Flanders
 December 26 – Aubrey de Vere, 1st Earl of Oxford 
 December 31 – Leopold V, duke of Austria (b. 1157)
 Basil Vatatzes, Byzantine governor and general

References